The superfamily Limacinoidea is a taxonomic group of small floating sea snails, pelagic marine opisthobranch gastropod mollusks.

Families
These families previously belonged to the superfamily Cavolinioidea.
 Creseidae Rampal, 1973
 Limacinidae Rampal, 1973
Families brought into synonymy
 Spiratellidae Dall, 1921: synonym of Limacinidae
 Spirialidae Chenu, 1859: synonym of Limacinidae

References

Euopisthobranchia